The 1906 Tasmanian state election was held on 29 March 1906 in the Australian state of Tasmania to elect 35 members of the Tasmanian House of Assembly.

John Evans became Premier of Tasmania on 12 July 1904 and was the incumbent premier at the election. At the election, Labour increased its seats to 7, and now held the balance of power.

Results

See also
Members of the Tasmanian House of Assembly, 1906–1909

References

1906
1906 elections in Australia
March 1906 events
1900s in Tasmania